Kathleen Taylor may refer to:

 Kathleen Taylor (biologist), popular science author and a research scientist 
 Kathleen Taylor (business executive) (born 1957), chair of the board of the Royal Bank of Canada
 Kathleen Taylor (field hockey) (born 1984), South African Olympic field hockey player
 Kathleen Taylor (politician), Oregon state representative
 Kathleen C. Taylor (born 1942), chemist
 Kathleen de Vere Taylor (c. 1873–1949), American suffragist and stockbroker